Leonela is a Venezuelan telenovela written by Delia Fiallo and produced by Radio Caracas Televisión in 1983. The telenovela was divided into two parts: the first part Leonela had 55 episodes and the second part titled Miedo al amor was produced in 1984. It was distributed internationally by Coral International.

During its airing, the telenovela was surrounded by controversy because of its theme of rape and love.  A remake, titled Leonela, muriendo de amor, was made in Peru in 1997.

Mayra Alejandra and Carlos Olivier starred as the protagonists.

Synopsis
Leonela Ferrari Mirabal is a young and beautiful woman who has finished her law career abroad and returns to Venezuela to marry her boyfriend Otto Mendoza. On the day of their engagement, Otto who is an arrogant and egotistical man, humiliates and beats Pedro Luis Guerra, a poor and hardworking man who gets drunk and vows to get revenge on Otto. That night when Leonela goes out for a walk on the beach, she meets Pedro Luis who then decides to get his revenge on Otto by raping Leonela.

Due to the rape, Otto dumps Leonela, her friends abandon her, and she is shunned by high society, but her misfortunes do not end there, as she finds herself pregnant as a result of the rape. Leonela's uncle, Joaquin Machado sends thugs to beat up Pedro Luis, but one of them is killed during the fight, and Pedro Luis is sentenced to jail for 12 years. Leonela despises her son from the moment she learns of her pregnancy, and she decides to give him up for adoption. Although Pedro Luis begs her to give the child to his family, Leonela nevertheless leaves the baby at an orphanage. However, he secretly sends his sister-in-law Nieves María to secretly begin the process of adopting him.

Years later, Pedro Luis, who has studied Law while in prison, gets a sentence reduction on good behavior. Leonela who has since regretted giving her son up for adoption and begins searching for him without knowing that Pedro Luis had him adopted. Leonela comes across Pedro Luis in the courts, and slowly by slowly they begin to fall in love. Some time later, Pedro Luis reveals he had his sister-in-law adopt their child who is now named Pedrito. At first, Pedrito is hostile to Leonela since he thinks she will take his father away. But a determined Leonela wins his affection. Leonela and Pedro Luis get married despite everyone's protests.

Cast
Mayra Alejandra as Leonela Ferrari Mirabal
Carlos Olivier as Pedro Luis
Flavio Caballero as Maname
Hilda Abrahamz  as Maribella
Carlos Marquez as Zio Gioacchino
Loly Sanchez as Nieves Maria
Carlos Camara Jr. as Otto
Gladys Caceres as Estela
Carlos Mata as Willy
Jeannette Rodríguez as Paty
Javier Vidal as Rafael
Julie Restifo as Claudia
Carlos Villamizar as Ramon
Eric Noriega as Trino

References

External links
Leonela at the Internet Movie Database
Opening Credits

1983 telenovelas
RCTV telenovelas
Venezuelan telenovelas
1983 Venezuelan television series debuts
1983 Venezuelan television series endings
Spanish-language telenovelas
Television shows set in Venezuela